Herbert James Fry (28 October 1870 – 19 January 1953) was an Australian sportsman who played first-class cricket for Victoria and Australian rules football with Melbourne in the Victorian Football League (VFL).

Fry played eight first-class cricket matches with Victoria, three of them in the Sheffield Shield. He also umpired a first-class match between Victoria and New Zealand in 1899. When not keeping wicket, Fry bowled right arm off-break and took 4 wickets at 60.00 during his career. The biggest name out of his four scalps was Marylebone Cricket Club captain Plum Warner, whom he dismissed at the Melbourne Cricket Ground in 1904.

In his brief VFL career at Melbourne, Fry was used as a ruckman. He played five games in the league's inaugural season in 1897, including Melbourne's historic first VFL match and their losing semi final. His sixth and last senior game came in the opening round of 1898 before he injured his knee and was forced to retire.

See also
 List of Victoria first-class cricketers

References

External links

 Herbert Fry: Demonwiki.

1870 births
1953 deaths
Australian rules footballers from Victoria (Australia)
Melbourne Football Club players
Australian cricketers
Victoria cricketers
Australian cricket umpires
Melbourne Cricket Club cricketers
Australian rules footballers from Adelaide
Cricketers from Adelaide
Port Adelaide Football Club (SANFL) players
Port Adelaide Football Club players (all competitions)
Melbourne Football Club (VFA) players
Wicket-keepers